The Casey Claw is a rudimental snare drum technique that is used as an impressive visual effect for a very short phrase of music.  It is not intended to be used as a regular drumming technique, and it has mainly been used in drum and bugle corps.  The technique gives the impression that one stick is spinning very quickly while at the same time a rapid succession of notes is being played on the drum.  It was originally developed by Mark Casey in 1993, a former marching member and drum sergeant of The Cavaliers of Rosemont, Illinois.

The actual rudiment is essentially a double stroke roll (with the sticking being "RRLLRRLLRRLL"), the difference being that the first note of every right hand double is played with the "butt" end of the drum stick (called "backsticking"), and the very next note of the double is played with the normal playing end, or tip, of the drum stick.  The technique is generally regarded as being rather difficult, which is likely the reason that The Cavaliers are the only drum corps to have used it in performance (1994 and 1995).  It was first publicly performed however by the University of Kentucky Indoor Drum Line in 1993 in the PASIC and BOA Indoor Percussion contests.  As a side note, Mark Casey was the center snare in that line as well.

Technique summary 
To play the Casey Claw, the right hand must use a different technique than the normal match grip technique.  The stick is held with the right hand in the middle of the stick (as opposed to the normal playing position where the right hand grips the stick closer to the butt end).  The right stick is also held in a fist, where all the fingers wrap around the stick and the thumb wraps around in the other direction, which also differs from the match grip technique.  The right hand is held straight out over the drum head, higher and farther out than its usual playing position.

The right hand turns quickly in a repetitive, counter-clockwise motion, where the butt end hits first and the tip hits immediately after the butt on its way down.  The left-handed doubles are placed in between the right hand notes.  The left hand technique does not need to change (traditional or match grip may be used for the left hand), although it is often useful to play the left hand farther back from the center of the drum in order to leave room for the right hand, otherwise the right hand stick often hits the left hand stick.

The Hulka Helicopter, by Scott "Hulka" McCoy (also a former marching member and drum sergeant of The Cavaliers), is a variation of the Casey Claw, where both the left and right hands use the Casey Claw technique.

External links 
cavaliers.org - An explanation of the Casey Claw by Scott McCoy.
video.google.com - A demonstration of the Casey Claw by Scott McCoy.

Percussion performance techniques